Crystl Irene Bustos (born September 8, 1977), also known as The Big Bruiser, is an American softball player at the designated hitter or third base position although on the roster she is  a designated player. She is a two-time Olympic gold medalist. She holds the world record for home runs during an Olympic series, with six.

Career
Bustos, a Mexican American, was born in Canyon Country, California (currently a part of Santa Clarita). She began her career playing softball at Canyon Country Little League and attended Palm Beach Community College.  She is a member of the 2008 U.S. Olympic softball team, which won the silver  medal after losing to Japan in the gold-medal game, the first loss for the U.S. women in 23 straight Olympic games. Her accomplishments also include two World Cup Championships (2006 and 2007), three Pan American gold medals (1999, 2003 and 2007), and a gold medal at the 2006 ISF World Championships. She has also played for the NPF Akron Racers, and was the Most Valuable Player in the WPSL for the Orlando Wahoos in 1998.

Bustos announced that she would retire from international competition after the 2008 Beijing Olympics.

Bustos was named 2008 USA Softball Player of the Year. She became the field manager for the Akron Racers in October 2009, but elected to return to the playing field for the Racers in 2010.

Statistics

References

External links
 Crystl Bustos at SoftballPerformance.com
 
 
 

1977 births
Softball players from California
American sportspeople of Mexican descent
Living people
Olympic gold medalists for the United States in softball
Olympic silver medalists for the United States in softball
Olympic softball players of the United States
Softball players at the 2000 Summer Olympics
Softball players at the 2004 Summer Olympics
Softball players at the 2007 Pan American Games
Softball players at the 2008 Summer Olympics
Medalists at the 2008 Summer Olympics
Medalists at the 2004 Summer Olympics
Palm Beach State Panthers softball players
Medalists at the 2000 Summer Olympics
Pan American Games gold medalists for the United States
People from Canyon Country, Santa Clarita, California
Pan American Games medalists in softball
Akron Racers players
Sportspeople from Los Angeles County, California
Medalists at the 2007 Pan American Games